Story of the flower-letter (chữ Hán: 花箋記) is a famous vernacular Vietnamese poem written in Nôm script. It was written by Nguyễn Huy Tự (1743-1790) and revised by Nguyễn Thiện (1763-1818). The poem was originally inspired by the late 17th century Chinese poem, Faazin Gei, that had it made its way to Japan and Vietnam.

References

Vietnamese poems